Brigidine College may refer to:

Brigidine College, Indooroopilly
Brigidine College Randwick
Brigidine College, St Ives